Szymon Jakubiszak (born 13 February 1998) is a Polish professional volleyball player. At the professional club level, he plays for Indykpol AZS Olsztyn.

Career

Clubs
After 5 seasons in junior teams of LOTOS Trefl Gdańsk, he debuted in PlusLiga in 2016.

National team
On 10 September 2016, he achieved a title of the U20 European Champion after winning 7 out of 7 matches at the tournament, and beating Ukraine in the final (3–1). On 2 July 2017, Poland, including Jakubiszak, achieved a title of the U21 World Champions after beating Cuba in the final (3–0). His national team won 47 matches in the row and never lost. The U21 World Champion title ended his time in youth national teams.

Honours

Clubs
 National championships
 2017/2018  Polish Cup, with Trefl Gdańsk

Youth national team
 2016  CEV U20 European Championship
 2017  FIVB U21 World Championship

References

External links

 
 Player profile at PlusLiga.pl 
 Player profile at Volleybox.net

1998 births
Living people
Sportspeople from Gdańsk
Polish men's volleyball players
Trefl Gdańsk players
Cuprum Lubin players
AZS Olsztyn players
Middle blockers